Jordan Jones (born 29 June 1990) is an Australian rules footballer 
previously listed with the Williamstown Football Club in the Victorian Football League (VFL) for season 2017-2018 and also previously listed with West Perth Football Club in the West Australian Football League (WAFL) from 2012-2016. 
He previously played for the West Coast Eagles in the Australian Football League (AFL). Jones was selected at pick 52 in the 2008 AFL Draft with West Coast's 4th round selection. He made his debut for the Eagles at the end of the 2010 season, playing two games, before being de-listed at the end of the 2011 season.

Junior football
Jones moved from his home in Melbourne to Ocean Grove in 2000.
Jones played his junior football for the Ocean Grove/Collendina Cobras and Ocean Grove Football Club. He played for Ocean Grove's senior side by the time he was 17. Jones proved his worth at a young age by being selected in the Vic Country team for the 2006 AFL Under 16 Championships. He was named in the best in Vic Country's Round 2 loss to Vic Metro.

Basketball career
Jones excelled at both basketball and football, so knew that later in life he would have to make a choice. He played as a point guard, captaining the Vic Country Under 16 national championship-winning side in 2005. It was however after he had a basketball carnival one week and a football carnival two weeks later, where he realised that juggling the two was too hard, and he chose football where he played for the Geelong Falcons.

Senior football career

Geelong Falcons career
Jones played for the Geelong Falcons in the TAC Cup, the premier U/18s competition in Victoria. He played 10 matches in 2007, and had played 14 matches in 2008 before injuring his shoulder in the latter half of the season.

2008 U/18 National Championships
Jones was selected in the Vic Country team for the 2008 AFL Under 18 Championships. He was a consistent performer and played in all 5 matches. He played especially well in one match against Western Australia where he "controlled precedings" across centre half-back. Jones kicked a goal and was named in the best in the final match of the tournament against Tasmania.

2008 Draft selection
Jones was selected by  using their fourth round pick, no. 52. There was doubt over whether he would be picked, as he tore his shoulder muscle in a match playing for Vic Country, which destroyed his second half of the season for the Falcons. Falcons regional manager Michael Turner gave him a "60% chance" of being drafted in 2008. ,  and  all showed interest in Jones, however it was West Coast who ended up selecting him.

Peel Thunder career
Jones wa allocated to play for the Peel Thunder Football Club in the West Australian Football League (WAFL). Jones has played 10 games so far this season, wearing #17. Arguably his best game for the season so far was in Round 12 against East Fremantle, where he collected 23 disposals and 9 marks.

West Coast Eagles career
Jones made his senior debut for the West Coast Eagles at the end of the 2010 season. He did not play a game for the club in 2011, and was de-listed at the end of the season. He joined the West Perth Football Club in January 2012, signing a two-year contract.

Statistics

Geelong Falcons

Vic Country

Peel Thunder

References

1990 births
Living people
Australian rules footballers from Victoria (Australia)
Geelong Falcons players
Peel Thunder Football Club players
West Coast Eagles players
West Perth Football Club players
Williamstown Football Club players